"The Sixteen-Millimeter Shrine", starring Ida Lupino, is episode four of the American television series The Twilight Zone. It originally aired on October 23, 1959, on CBS. The title is a reference to 16 mm film.

Opening narration

Plot
Aging film star Barbara Jean Trenton secludes herself in her private screening room, where she reminisces about her past by watching her old films from the 1930s. In an attempt to bring her out into the real world, her agent Danny Weiss arranges a part for her in a new movie.  Barbara and the man who runs the studio, Marty Sall, however, have historically had a contentious relationship; he is rather petty, small, and callous. He offers her the role of a mother, which she refuses, to which Marty then insults her, telling her she's living in the past and that any role she would receive would be charity. Barbara leaves in anger. When Barbara returns home, she and Danny get into an argument when she decides to throw a party for her show-business friends. Danny points out that all of those friends have either moved away or have died, and that she keeps wishing for things that are dead.

After the argument, Barbara has, according to her maid, chosen to stay in the screening room day and night. Danny decides to bring a former leading man—now also older, Jerry Herndon, many years retired from acting and managing a chain of grocery stores—to visit her. She is horrified by her friend's aged appearance and orders them both to leave. After the ill-fated visit, Barbara goes back into the projector room and puts on a movie that features Jerry's younger self. She will not accept that the present-day Jerry is the real one and voices her wish repeatedly to join the one on the screen; the screen blurs accordingly.

Barbara's maid comes with a snack and coffee, only to find the room empty—and is horrified by what she sees on the screen. She calls Danny and, when he comes over, tells him that—to her mind—Barbara has vanished from the house. He runs the projector and sees, in the movie, the front hall of the house filled with movie stars, looking as they did in the old films. Barbara descends the stairs, welcomes them to the party and says that dinner will be by the pool. As she starts off with Jerry, Danny tries to call her back to 1959 and reality. In response, she blows a kiss, throws her scarf toward the camera, and departs. The film ends. In the actual front hall, Danny finds Barbara's scarf. "To wishes, Barbie", he says wistfully. "To the ones that come true."

Closing narration

Preview for next week's story

Episode notes
This episode contains several similarities to Billy Wilder's 1950 film Sunset Boulevard starring Gloria Swanson and shares the same composer and conductor of music, Franz Waxman. Mitchell Leisen directed Billy Wilder scripts at Paramount in the 1930s. It also evokes 1952's The Star with Bette Davis which was directed by Stuart Heisler and released by Twentieth Century Fox.

Ida Lupino later directed the season five episode "The Masks". She was both the only person to have acted in one episode and directed another, and the only woman to direct a Twilight Zone episode.

Martin Balsam returned to star in the season four episode "The New Exhibit". Between his two episodes of Twilight Zone, Balsam appeared in three iconic films of the era: Psycho, Breakfast at Tiffany's and Cape Fear.

References

Further reading
 DeVoe, Bill. (2008). Trivia from The Twilight Zone. Albany, GA: Bear Manor Media.
 Grams, Martin. (2008). The Twilight Zone: Unlocking the Door to a Television Classic. Churchville, MD: OTR Publishing.

External links
 

The Twilight Zone (1959 TV series season 1) episodes
1959 American television episodes
Television episodes written by Rod Serling